Kenneth Barry Mealand (24 January 1943 – 2 April 2013) was an English professional footballer who played as a right back.

Career
Born in Carshalton, Mealand played for Fulham, Rotherham United and Goole Town.

Later life and death
Mealand died on 2 April 2013.

References

1943 births
2013 deaths
Footballers from Carshalton
English footballers
Fulham F.C. players
Rotherham United F.C. players
Goole Town F.C. players
English Football League players
Association football fullbacks